Strmec may refer to:

Places in Croatia:
 Strmec, Sveta Nedelja, a village near Sveta Nedelja, Zagreb County (also known as Strmec Samoborski from 1910 to 1991)
 Strmec Podravski, a village near Petrijanec, Varaždin County
 Strmec Stubički, a village near Stubičke Toplice, Krapina-Zagorje County
 Strmec, Zagreb, a village part of the Brezovica district, City of Zagreb, Croatia (also known as Odranski Strmec)
 Strmec, Krapina-Zagorje County, a village near Veliko Trgovišće
 Strmec, Preseka, a village near Preseka, Zagreb County
 Strmec Bukevski, a village near Velika Gorica, Zagreb County

Places in Slovenia:
 Nova Cerkev, a settlement in the Municipality of Vojnik (known as Strmec (pri Vojniku) from 1952 to 1992)
 Strmec, Idrija, a settlement in the Municipality of Idrija
 Strmec, Litija, a settlement in the Municipality of Litija
 Strmec, Luče, a settlement in the Municipality of Luče
 Strmec, Velike Lašče, a settlement in the Municipality of Velike Lašče
 Strmec na Predelu, a settlement in the Municipality of Bovec
 Strmec nad Dobrno, a settlement in the Municipality of Dobrna
 Strmec pri Destrniku, a settlement in the Municipality of Destrnik
 Strmec pri Leskovcu, a settlement in the Municipality of Videm
 Strmec pri Ormožu, a settlement in the Municipality of Ormož
 Strmec pri Polenšaku, a settlement in the Municipality of Dornava
 Strmec pri Svetem Florijanu, a settlement in the Municipality of Rogaška Slatina